Dexiosis (Greek δεξίωσις dexiōsis, 'greeting' to δεξιόομαι dexioomai‚ 'to give (someone) the right (hand)' δεξιός, dexios 'right', Latin dextrarum iunctio‚ 'joining together of the right hands'), in the fine arts, is the representation of two people offering each other their right hand.

The dexiosis reliefs from Commagene are well known in which the then ruler is shown shaking hands with gods. Dexiosis reliefs are also known from Roman gravestones, which show the deceased with their spouses  Similarly, dexiosis reliefs are found on ancient coins and are they are intended to show bonds between two cities by shaking hands.

Portrayals of dexiosis are also known from much earlier times on vase paintings.

References

Greetings
Parting traditions
Hand gestures